Qələgah (also, Qalagah, Kalagyakh, and Kelagyakh) is a village and municipality in the Davachi Rayon of Azerbaijan.  It has a population of 255.  The municipality consists of the villages of Qələgah and Ləcədi.

References 

Populated places in Shabran District